Otachi may refer to:
Otachi, another name for the generation II Pokémon also called Sentret
Otachi, a Kaiju from the film Pacific Rim

See also
Ōdachi